The Ballad of [the] Canal or The Canal Ballad (Chinese: 运河谣) is a 2012 opera by composer Yin Qing based on Chinese folk music. The libretto was supplied by playwrights Huang Weiruo and Dong Ni and celebrates the story of the Beijing-Hangzhou Grand Canal, the longest canal in the world. The opera premiered at the National Centre for the Performing Arts (China) in 2012. The use of Chinese folk music was a departure from the NCPA's previous western-influenced Chinese-language operas. NCPA's in house audio visual company released a making of documentary including footage of rehearsals in July 2017.

References

Chinese western-style operas
Operas
2012 operas